The Western Air Defense Force (WADF) is an inactive United States Air Force organization.  Its last assignment was with Air Defense Command being stationed at Hamilton Air Force Base, California.  It was inactivated on July 1, 1960.

History 
WADF was an intermediate-level command and control organization of Air Defense Command.  Its origins date to 1 March 1949 when Continental Air Command (ConAC) reorganized Air Defense Command when it became an operating agency.  Air defense units within the Continental United States (CONUS) were given to the Eastern and Western Air Defense Liaison Groups, with Western and Eastern Air Defense Forces activated on 1 September 1949.

The command was originally assigned the region within the Continental United States (CONUS) to the west of the 102d degree of longitude, from the Canada–US border in the north to the Rio Grande border between the United States and Mexico in the south and west to the Pacific Ocean coastline.  This was adjusted in 1951 with the activation of Central Air Defense Force (CADF) with the region being adjusted slightly to the west to the border of Montana and North Dakota at the Canada–US border, south along the eastern borders of Montana, Wyoming, Colorado and New Mexico to the Mexico–US border. Organizations stationed east of that boundary were transferred to CADF.

The delineation was again adjusted in March 1956 to the region generally to the west of the 114th degree of longitude, roughly along the eastern borders of Idaho, Nevada and California from the Canada–US border in the north to the Mexico–US border in the south.  Organizations stationed east of that boundary were transferred to CADF, whose region was shifted westward.

Western Air Defense Force was inactivated on 1 July 1960, with its assigned units reassigned either to 25th or 28th Air Divisions, or to the new Air Defense Sectors created with the advent of the Semi Automatic Ground Environment (SAGE) system.

Lineage 
 Established as Western Air Defense Force and organized September 1, 1949.
 Discontinued July 1, 1960

Assignments 
 Continental Air Command, September 1, 1949 –  January 1, 1951
 Air Defense Command, January 1, 1951 –  July 1, 1960

Stations 
 Hamilton AFB, California, September 1, 1949 –  July 1, 1960

Components

Air Divisions

 8th Air Division (AEW&Con)
 Stationed at McClellan AFB, California
 Activated by Western Air Defense Force, 1 May 1954
 Re-assigned to Air Defense Command, 1 May 1955

 9th Air Division (Defense)
 Stationed at Geiger Field, Washington
 Activated by Western Air Defense Force, 8 October 1954
 Inactivated on 15 August 1958

 25th Air Division
 Stationed at Silver Lake, Washington
 Re-assigned to Western Air Defense Force from Fourth Air Force, 1 February 1950
 Moved to McChord AFB, Washington, 15 September 1951
 Re-designated 25th Air Division (SAGE), 1 March 1959
 Re-assigned to Air Defense Command, 1 July 1960

 27th Air Division (Defense)
 Stationed at Norton AFB, California
 Activated by Western Air Defense Force, 20 September 1950
 Inactivated on 1 October 1959

 28th Air Division (Defense)
 Stationed at Hamilton AFB, California
 Activated by Western Air Defense Force, 1 January 1951
 Re-designated 28th Air Division (SAGE), 1 July 1960
 Re-assigned to Air Defense Command, 1 July 1960

 29th Air Division
 Stationed at Great Falls AFB, Montana
 Activated by Western Air Defense Force, 1 March 1951
 Great Falls AFB renamed Malmstrom AFB, Montana, 1 October 1955
 Re-designated 29th Air Division (SAGE), 1 July 1960
 Re-assigned to Air Defense Command, 1 July 1960

 34th Air Division (Defense)
 Assigned to Kirtland AFB, New Mexico
 Activated by Western Air Defense Force, 5 January 1951
 Re-assigned to Central Air Defense Force (CADF), 15 February 1953

Air Defense Sectors
 Los Angeles Air Defense Sector
 Stationed at Norton AFB, California
 Re-assigned to Western Air Defense Force from 27th Air Division, 1 October 1959
 Re-assigned to 28th Air Division, 1 July 1960

 Phoenix Air Defense Sector
 Stationed at Luke AFB, Arizona
 Activated by Western Air Defense Force, 15 June 1959
 Re-assigned to 28th Air Division, 1 July 1960

Wings

 1st Fighter-Interceptor Wing
 Stationed at George AFB, California
 Re-assigned to Western Air Defense Force, 1 January 1951
 Inactivated 6 February 1952

 78th Fighter-Interceptor Wing
 Stationed at Hamilton AFB, California
 Re-assigned to Western Air Defense Force, 1 January 1951
 Inactivated 6 February 1952

 81st Fighter-Interceptor Wing
 Stationed at Larson AFB, Washington
 Re-assigned to Western Air Defense Force, 1 January 1951
 Re-assigned to Third Air Force (USAFE), 22 August 1951

 101st Fighter-Interceptor Wing
 Federalized Maine Air National Guard
 Stationed at Larson AFB, Washington
 Re-assigned to Western Air Defense Force from Eastern Air Defense Force (EADF), 2 August 1951
 Inactivated and returned to state control, 6 February 1952

 142d Fighter-Interceptor Wing
 Federalized Oregon Air National Guard, 2 March 1951
 Stationed at Geiger Field, Washington
 Re-assigned to Eastern Air Defense Force (EADF), 11 April 1951

 325th Fighter-Interceptor Wing
 Stationed at McChord AFB, Washington
 Re-assigned to Western Air Defense Force from Air Defense Command, 1 May 1951
 Inactivated 6 February 1952

 552d Airborne Early Warning and Control Wing
 Stationed at McClellan AFB, California
 Re-assigned to Western Air Defense Force from 8th Air Division (AEW&Con), 1 July 1957
 Re-assigned to 28th Air Division, 1 July 1960

 4702d Defense Wing
 Stationed at Hamilton AFB, California
 Activated by Western Air Defense Force, 1 February 1952
 Re-assigned to 25th Air Division, 1 November 1952

 4703d Defense Wing
 Stationed at Larson AFB, Washington
 Activated by Western Air Defense Force, 1 February 1952
 Discontinued 7 April 1952

 4704th Defense Wing
 Stationed at McChord AFB, Washington
 Activated by Western Air Defense Force, 1 February 1952
 Re-assigned to 25th Air Division, 1 December 1952

 4705th Defense Wing
 Stationed at Norton AFB, California
 Activated by Western Air Defense Force, 1 February 1952
 Discontinued 1 March 1952

 4750th Training Wing (Air Defense)
 Stationed at Yuma County Airport, Arizona
 Activated by Western Air Defense Force, 1 September 1953
 Re-assigned to Air Defense Command, 1 October 1953

Groups
 162d Aircraft Control and Warning Group
 Federalized Washington Air National Guard, 12 May 1951
 Assigned to Larson AFB, Washington
 Re-assigned to 25th Air Division, 25 June 1951

Squadrons
 115th Aircraft Control and Warning Squadron
 Federalized Alabama Air National Guard, 20 January 1952
 Assigned to Geiger Field, Washington
 Assigned to WADF, 17 March 1952-16 February 1953

 917th Aircraft Control and Warning Squadron
 Assigned to Puntzi Mountain AS, British Columbia
 Assigned to WADF, 16 April 1952-1 January 1953

 918th Aircraft Control and Warning Squadron
 Assigned to Baldy Hughes AS, British Columbia
 Assigned to WADF, 16 April 1952-16 February 1953

 919th Aircraft Control and Warning Squadron
 Assigned to Saskatoon Mountain AS, Alberta
 Assigned to WADF, 16 April 1952-16 February 1953

See also 
 Eastern Air Defense Force
 Central Air Defense Force

References

 USAF Aerospace Defense Command publication, The Interceptor, January 1979 (Volume 21, Number 1)
 Maurer, Maurer (1983). Air Force Combat Units Of World War II. Maxwell AFB, Alabama: Office of Air Force History. 
 Ravenstein, Charles A. (1984). Air Force Combat Wings Lineage and Honors Histories 1947–1977. Maxwell AFB, Alabama: Office of Air Force History. 
  A Handbook of Aerospace Defense Organization 1946 - 1980,  by Lloyd H. Cornett and Mildred W. Johnson, Office of History, Aerospace Defense Center, Peterson Air Force Base, Colorado
 Winkler, David F. (1997), Searching the skies: the legacy of the United States Cold War defense radar program. Prepared for United States Air Force Headquarters Air Combat Command.

Numbered air forces of the United States Air Force
1949 establishments in California
1960 disestablishments in California
Military history of California
Military units and formations established in 1949
Military units and formations disestablished in 1984